Mika-Matti Hyvärinen (born April 18, 1991) is a Finnish former ice hockey left winger.

Hyvärinen began his career KalPa, playing in their Jr. C, Jr. B and Jr. A teams between 2006 and 2012, though he never made an appearance for their senior team. Following his release in 2012, he joined SaPKo of the second-tier Mestis.

After three seasons with SaPKo, Hyvärinen joined TUTO Hockey on August 28, 2015. He spent three seasons with TUTO before joining IPK on August 1, 2018. He played just eight games for IPK before suffering an injury and on January 8, 2019, the team announced Hyvärinen was retiring due to injury.

Career statistics

References

External links

1991 births
Living people
Finnish ice hockey left wingers
Iisalmen Peli-Karhut players
People from Kuopio
SaPKo players
TuTo players
Sportspeople from North Savo